William McDowell-White (born 13 April 1998) is an Australian professional basketball player for the New Zealand Breakers of the National Basketball League (NBL). He is listed at 6'5" (1.96 m) tall, and 185 lbs. (84 kg) in weight.

Early life and career
McDowell-White was born in Brisbane, into a family of Indigenous Australian (Arrernte) descent. His father, Darryl, played Australian rules football at the professional level, for the Brisbane Bears/Lions over a 14-year career, which included three AFL premierships and 268 senior games. William grew up playing Australian rules football for Coorparoo, and was placed in the Brisbane Lions talent academy, at the age of 13. Despite seemingly heading down the same career path as his father, William surprised many, when he decided to focus on basketball, and gave up playing football at the age of 15.

In 2014 and 2016, McDowell-White played in the SEABL for the Brisbane Spartans. He re-joined the Spartans in 2017 with their move to the QBL.

In 2016, McDowell-White played in the Nike Hoop Summit and attended Fresno State University, but failed to get academically eligible to play for the Bulldogs.

Professional career

Sydney Kings
In December 2016, McDowell-White joined the Sydney Kings of Australia's NBL as a development player for the rest of the 2016–17 season.

Brose Bamberg / Baunach Young Pikes
McDowell-White signed a four-year deal with Brose Bamberg, of the Basketball Bundesliga, which is Germany's top division, in July 2017. He was later assigned to Baunach Young Pikes, the farm team of Brose Bamberg, for the 2017–18 season's German 2nd Division season. He was recalled to Brose Bamberg, on 17 December. In the 2017–18 season, while playing for Baunach, he was named the ProA Young Player of the Year. After testing the waters for the 2018 NBA draft, McDowell-White returned to Brose Bamberg for the 2018–19 season. He spent most of the season with Baunach again.

In May 2019, McDowell-White had a one-game stint with the Southern Districts Spartans in the QBL.

Rio Grande Valley Vipers and RedCity Roar 
After failing to be drafted in the 2019 NBA draft, McDowell-White signed an Exhibit-10 contract with the Houston Rockets, and would go on to play for the Rockets in the 2019 NBA Summer League. He later had his contract converted to a two-way deal, a decision that was later reversed. On 27 September, McDowell-White was waived by the Rockets to make room on their training camp roster for Ryan Anderson. McDowell-White was then added to the roster of the Rockets' NBA G League affiliate, the Rio Grande Valley Vipers. He suffered an injury in November and was inactive for several weeks.

McDowell-White played for the RedCity Roar of the Queensland State League during the 2020 season.

McDowell-White turned down multiple offers from NBL teams to return to the NBA G League for the 2020–21 season. After another quick stint with the Rockets in December 2020, he played for the Vipers in the G League hub season between February and March 2021.

New Zealand Breakers
On 13 March 2021, McDowell-White signed with the New Zealand Breakers. On 16 April 2021, he recorded 13 points, 14 assists and 10 rebounds in a 91–71 win over the Brisbane Bullets. He became just the second player in Breakers' history to record a triple-double, joining Cedric Jackson.

On 26 June 2021, McDowell-White re-signed with the Breakers for the 2021–22 NBL season.

On 25 May 2022, McDowell-White re-signed with the Breakers for the 2022–23 NBL season.

National team career
In 2013, McDowell-White represented Australia at the FIBA Oceania Under-16 Championship. Two years later, he played for Australia at the 2015 FIBA Under-19 World Championship.

In June 2022, McDowell-White was named in the Boomers' World Cup Qualifiers team.

References

External links
William McDowell-White at gleague.nba.com
William McDowell-White at euroleague.net
William McDowell-White at fiba.com
William McDowell-White at eurobasket.com

1998 births
Living people
Australian expatriate basketball people in Germany
Australian expatriate basketball people in the United States
Australian men's basketball players
Basketball players from Brisbane
Baunach Young Pikes players
Brose Bamberg players
Indigenous Australian basketball players
New Zealand Breakers players
Point guards
Rio Grande Valley Vipers players
Shooting guards
Sydney Kings players